Kenneth A. Cox (December 7, 1916 – October 31, 2011) was an American attorney who served as a Commissioner of the Federal Communications Commission from 1963 to 1970.

He died on October 31, 2011, in Bethesda, Maryland at age 94.

References

1916 births
2011 deaths
Members of the Federal Communications Commission
Washington (state) Democrats
United States Army personnel of World War II
United States Army personnel of the Korean War
Kennedy administration personnel
Lyndon B. Johnson administration personnel
Nixon administration personnel